Lithops villetii is a species of the genus Lithops under the family Aizoaceae. The succulent plant is named after Dr. C. T. Villet. It is also commonly referred to as L. deboeri. It is native to the Calvinia District, Namaqualand, Northern Cape, South Africa.

Description 
The leaves of L. villetii are extremely thick and light grey with tinges of green, yellow, or brown. They sometimes form in clumps, with the leaves paired in twos. The leaves also have spots of color, varying from plant to plant. Flowers are varying tinges of white, and are daisy-like.

References 

villetii
Taxa named by Louisa Bolus